Vakkaliga Swamy Vinaya (born 24 November 1985) is a former Indian field hockey player who played as a midfielder for the national team. Among the major tournaments he represented India at include 2005 Men's Hockey Champions Trophy and 2006 Asian Games. Vinaya's "capability in one-on-one situations" received praise from German hockey coach Valentin Altenburg. In 2010, Vinaya signed up for World Series Hockey.

Apart from hockey, Vinaya represents his club Air India in cricket in the second division league.

References

External links
Player profile at stick2hockey.com

1985 births
Living people
People from Kodagu district
Indian male field hockey players
Field hockey players from Karnataka
Field hockey players at the 2006 Asian Games
Asian Games competitors for India
2006 Men's Hockey World Cup players